Nicholas Hely Hutchinson (born 1955) is a painter, based in Dorset. Initially influenced by Dufy and Matisse, he has also drawn on the English NeoRomantic tradition. He settled near Blandford, Dorset, and the countryside of that county and Wiltshire, horse racing, interiors and still life were among his subjects. He studied at Harrow School, Saint Martin's School of Art and Bristol Polytechnic. He is represented in the Government Art Collection. Hutchinson is the third son of the 8th Earl of Donoughmore, an old Irish family.

References

20th-century English painters
English male painters
21st-century English painters
21st-century English male artists
People educated at Harrow School
Alumni of Saint Martin's School of Art
Alumni of the University of the West of England, Bristol
Younger sons of earls
Living people
1955 births
20th-century English male artists